Early parliamentary elections were held in Moldova on 27 February 1994. They were the country's first competitive elections, and followed deadlock in Parliament over the issue of joining the Commonwealth of Independent States. The result was a victory for the Democratic Agrarian Party of Moldova (PDAM), which won 56 of the 104 seats.

Electoral system
In 1993 a new electoral law was passed, which removed the right to vote from serving members of the military, whilst removing the right to run for election from all members of the military, the judiciary, the police force, national security services and prosecutors. A special Central Election Commission was formed by the Supreme Court, consisting of the five judges in the Court and one representative of each party or alliance. The parliament was elected by proportional representation in a single national constituency. The electoral threshold was set at 4% for both independent candidates and political parties.

Results

References

Moldova
1994 elections in Moldova
1994 in Moldova
Parliamentary elections in Moldova